Kazimierz Żygulski (1919 – 23 February 2012) was a Polish sociologist, political activist and Minister of Culture.

Biography
In 1937, he graduated from high school humanities in Lviv, and then he studied at the Faculty of Law of the University of Jan Kazimierz, where he graduated during the first Soviet occupation of Lviv in 1941. He belonged to the youth organizations of the Democratic Club and the Democratic Party.

During the German occupation of Lviv was a member of the Government Delegation for Poland, as well as a judge of the Special Court. In 1944, he was arrested by the NKVD and sentenced for his participation in the work of the Delegation for 15 years in a labour camp. He was sent to a camp in the Komi Republic in the north of the USSR where he lived for ten years, until 1955.

In 1956 he returned to Poland. From 1957 he worked at the Polish Academy of Sciences, and then as part of the Institute of Philosophy and Sociology (1959-1990). In 1973 he became an associate professor, and then a full professor in 1983.

From 1982-1986 he was minister of culture and art, and in the period 1987-1989 chairman of the Polish Committee for UNESCO and a member of the Executive Board of UNESCO in Paris. In 1983, he was elected to the Presidium of the National Council of the Society of Polish-Soviet Friendship. In August 1984 he joined the Civic Committee of the Celebrations of the 40th anniversary of the Warsaw Uprising. From 1986-1989 he was a member of the National Committee of Grunwald .

He was president and professor School of Social and Economics in Warsaw from 1996 until his death.

Papers
He wrote a number of papers on the theory and the sociology of culture including:

 Introduction to cultural issues
 Values and cultural patterns
 Community laughter
 Festival and culture.

Documentary
In September 2009, Edusat TV started broadcasting a 10-part documentary series entitled "Balance Generations", about the life of Kazimierz Żygulski, to celebrate his 90 years of life. This series is based on an interview with Kazimierz Żygulski, referring to the dramatic moments of his life.

References

1919 births
2012 deaths
Polish sociologists
Polish deportees to Soviet Union
Polish people detained by the NKVD